Tsoi or TSOI may refer to:
Geto Heaven Remix T.S.O.I. (The Sound of Illadelph), an album by American hip-hop artist Common
Viktor Tsoi, Russian singer
Anita Tsoy, Russian singer-songwriter

It may also be an alternative spelling of two different surnames:
Cai (surname), a Chinese surname, in Cantonese pronunciation
Choi (Korean name), especially as a transcription of the Cyrillic 'Цой'

See also 
 Tsoy (disambiguation)